The Lophiostomataceae are a family of fungi in the order Pleosporales. Taxa have a widespread distribution, especially in temperate regions, and are saprobic or necrotrophic on herbaceous and woody stems.

References

 
Dothideomycetes families
Taxa named by Pier Andrea Saccardo
Taxa described in 1883